Neatus is a genus of darkling beetles in the family Tenebrionidae. There are at least four described species in Neatus.

Species
These four species belong to the genus Neatus:
 Neatus noctivagus (Mulsant & Rey, 1854) g
 Neatus picipes (Herbst, 1797) g
 Neatus subaequalis (Reitter, 1920) g
 Neatus tenebrioides (Beauvois) g b
Data sources: i = ITIS, c = Catalogue of Life, g = GBIF, b = Bugguide.net

References

Further reading

External links

 

Tenebrioninae